

Live at the Village Vanguard is a Tom Harrell album recorded for RCA with Harrell's then quintet and released in 2002. The band included Jimmy Greene on tenor sax, Ugonna Okegwo on bass, Xavier Davis on piano and Quincy Davis on drums. This is Harrell's first live album. A JazzTimes review called the album "a worthy addition to the library of recordings made at the Vanguard". With the exception of the 1940 standard "Everything Happens to Me", the album consists of mostly new compositions.

Track listing

Personnel
Credits adapted from AllMusic.
 Tom Harrell – trumpet
 Jimmy Greene – tenor saxophone
 Xavier Davis – piano
 Ugonna Okegwo – bass
 Quincy Davis – drums

References

External links 
Tom Harrell, Official Website

2002 live albums
Tom Harrell albums
Albums recorded at the Village Vanguard